Arabosi (Arapuś) is a rural locality (a village) in Urmarsky District of the Chuvash Republic, Russia, located on the Arya River. Postal code: 429403.

External links
Official website of Arabosinskoye Rural Settlement 
Consecration of the Church of St. Nicholas in Arabosi

Rural localities in Chuvashia
Tsivilsky Uyezd